Cloud Maintenance is an album by Kevin Hearn. It is his second solo album, after 1997's Mothball Mint, and his sixth solo release including his Thin Buckle releases. The album was released December 20, 2011.

Track listing

Personnel
Kevin Hearn - Vocals, piano, guitar, accordion, keyboards
Michael Phillip Wojewoda - Verse drums on 6, theremin on 6 and 10
Tony Thunder Smith - Drums on 3, 5, 8, and 9
Rob Kloet - Drums/percussion on 6, 7, and 8
Bob Scott - Drums on 4
Chris Gartner - Bass, vocals on 4
Arnold Robinson - Vocals on 2, 3, 5, 7, 9, and 10
Brian Macmillan - Vocals on 2, 5, and 7
Sahara MacDonald - Vocals on 3 and 10
Jenn Grant - Vocals on 9 and 10
David Christensen - Bass clarinet on 10
Maude Hudson - Vocal on 6
Garth Hudson - Electric piano on 6
Hawksley Workman - Vocal on 10
Derek Orford - Vocal on 10
Boothby Graffoe - Vocal on 10

Production
Producers: Kevin Hearn, Michael Phillip Wojewoda
Digital Editing: Kenny Luong
Mastering: Ted Jenson
Additional Engineering: Sam Ibbett, David Christensen, Paul Telman
Artwork: Don Porcella, Ivan Otis, Antoine Moonen
Drum Programming: Michael Phillip Wojewoda

References

2011 albums
Albums produced by Michael Phillip Wojewoda
Kevin Hearn and Thin Buckle albums